Out of This World is a British science fiction anthology television series made by the ITV franchise ABC Weekend TV for ITV. It was broadcast on ITV in 1962. A spin-off from the Armchair Theatre anthology series, each episode was introduced by the actor Boris Karloff. Many of the episodes were adaptations of stories by science fiction writers including Isaac Asimov, Philip K. Dick and Clifford D. Simak. The series is described by the British Film Institute as a precursor to the BBC science fiction anthology series Out of the Unknown, which was produced by Out of This World creator Irene Shubik after she left ABC. (Only one episode exists today and is available on DVD.)

Origins
Series creator Irene Shubik joined ABC Television as a story editor on the anthology series Armchair Theatre under producer Sydney Newman in 1960. A science fiction fan since her university days, Shubik approached Newman during the summer of 1961 with the notion of making a science fiction version of Armchair Theatre, similar to the Armchair Mystery Theatre spin-off that specialised in crime and mystery stories.  Shubik had already commissioned several science fiction tinged scripts for Armchair Theatre such as "The Omega Mystery" and "The Ship That Couldn't Stop".  However, the production that acted as a template for what would become Out of This World was "Murder Club", an adaptation of Robert Sheckley’s short story The Seventh Victim, starring Richard Briers, that aired under the Armchair Theatre banner on 3 December 1961.  Also around this time the BBC had scored a notable hit with the science fiction thriller A for Andromeda.

Production
Shubik was appointed story editor and Leonard White, who had produced the first two seasons of The Avengers, was assigned to produce. Leonard found Out of This World a welcome antidote to The Avengers, which had proved a difficult production; he recalled, "It was a great pleasure to make, getting away from today and exploring the unrealities (or so we thought) of tomorrow. An opportunity for the suspension of disbelief even in the here and now ambiance of television". The budget for each episode averaged £5,000.

Shubik soon ran into difficulties finding material suitable for adaptation, a problem that had plagued earlier aborted attempts to get a similar series off the ground.  A useful contact Shubik made was with John Carnell, a key figure in British science fiction, founder of the magazine New Worlds and agent for many British science fiction writers.  Carnell assisted Shubik in selecting material and put her in contact with writers and publishers.  Carnell also promoted the series heavily in New Worlds, giving it the cover of the July 1962 edition.  When a strike by actor's union Equity hit production of Armchair Theatre, it bought Shubik the extra time she needed to find sufficient scripts.  All but two episodes were adaptations of short stories and novels.  Shubik took the name Out of This World from a series of anthology collections published by Blackie and Son, edited by Amabel Williams-Ellis.

The actor Boris Karloff, well known for his association with the horror film genre, was chosen as host for the new series.  This was an idea taken from such U.S. anthology series as The Twilight Zone, Alfred Hitchcock Presents and Thriller (which Karloff himself had hosted) and was in line with what had been done for Armchair Mystery Theatre, which was introduced by Donald Pleasence.

Three scripts for Out of This World, adaptations of Philip K. Dick's "Impostor" and Clifford D. Simak's "Immigrant" as well as an original story called "Botany Bay", were supplied by Terry Nation, who would, a short time after, create the Daleks for Doctor Who. Nation's scripts were his first professional foray into science fiction, the genre for which he would become best known. Apart from a number of scripts for Doctor Who, Nation would go on to create the original science fiction series Survivors and Blake's 7.

Broadcast and critical reception
Originally, an adaptation of John Wyndham’s short story "Dumb Martian" was intended to launch the series. Sydney Newman elected, though, to broadcast the story as part of Armchair Theatre the week before Out of This World would make its debut. The play ended with an epilogue by Boris Karloff introducing and previewing the new series.

The first episode, "The Yellow Pill", attracted 11 million viewers, placing Out of This World eleventh in the television ratings for that week and beating the popular police drama series Z-Cars.

Critical reaction to Out of This World was, on the whole, positive. A Kinematograph Weekly review said that the series was "the most intelligent and best written of its genre since Quatermass" while The Times said, "in general the level of writing and direction has been encouragingly high [...] Out of This World may well help to banish forever the view of the summer as a time when just anything will do". H. F. Hall, writing in the Yorkshire Evening Post, described Out of This World as "the most accomplished thing of its kind that TV has yet produced... well schemed scripting and disciplined production". One viewer who enjoyed the series was The Goon Show's Michael Bentine who sent a telegram to Leonard White conveying "joyous congratulations for wonderful entertainment".

Influence
Although the series was judged a success, the departure of both Sydney Newman and Irene Shubik to the BBC meant that a second season was not made.  However, while at the BBC Shubik devised and produced Out of the Unknown, another science fiction anthology series that, like Out of This World, concentrated mainly on adaptations of short stories and novels and ran for four seasons between 1965 and 1971.  Two Out of This World scripts — "The Yellow Pill" and "Target Generation" — were remade by Out of the Unknown in its third season.  Shubik went on to become a noted television producer of series such as The Wednesday Play, Play for Today, Playhouse: The Mind Beyond and Rumpole of the Bailey and instigated, but did not produce, the acclaimed adaptation of The Jewel in the Crown.

Archive status
As was common practice among British broadcasters at the time, almost all of the episodes of Out of This World were wiped after broadcast and only "Little Lost Robot" is known to survive, which was released on DVD by the British Film Institute in 2014.

List of episodes
Thirteen episodes of Out of This World were broadcast on Saturday nights at 10 p.m. from 30 June 1962.  The Armchair Theatre presentation of "Dumb Martian" is also included in this list for completeness as it was originally intended to be part of Out of This World, in line with most episode guides published for this series. Only one episode ("Little Lost Robot") is known to exist. Complete audio recordings of the episodes "Cold Equations" and "Imposter" exist.

Notes

References

External links
 

1960s British science fiction television series
1962 British television series debuts
1962 British television series endings
1960s British anthology television series
Television shows produced by ABC Weekend TV
British science fiction television shows
ITV television dramas
Black-and-white British television shows
English-language television shows
Science fiction anthology television series